Jane Arden may refer to:

 Jane Gardiner (1758–1840), née Arden, British schoolmistress and grammarian.
 Jane Arden (director) (1927–1982), British director and actor
 Jane Arden (actress) (fl. since 1980s), British actor
 Jane Arden (comics), a daily newspaper comic strip which ran from 1927 to 1968

See also
 Jane (disambiguation)
 Arden (disambiguation)
 Arden (name)